Ramat Gan National Park (HaPark HaLe'umi) is a large urban park in the Tel Aviv District city of Ramat Gan, Israel. It is not actually a national park.

History
The initiator of the idea of setting up the park was the first mayor of Ramat Gan Avraham Krinitzi who actively promoted the idea. Krinitzi advocated for setting it in the southern part of the city. He is also buried there with his wife and driver, who all died in a car accident together on their way back from the city of Acre, where he was also the Mayor at the time.

The planting began in February 1951 and the park opened to the public in 1953. In 1959, an artificial lake was created, which was enlarged throughout the years.

The park covers an area of 1.9 km2. It is the second largest urban park in Israel, after the Yarkon Park. The park attracts 700-800 thousand visitors annually. The Ramat Gan Safari is adjacent to the park. Recently, a waterfall was added to the park as an expansion to the lake.

References

Ramat Gan
Parks in Israel
Urban public parks
Tourist attractions in Tel Aviv District